"The Charge of the Light Brigade" is an 1854 narrative poem by Alfred, Lord Tennyson about the Charge of the Light Brigade at the Battle of Balaclava during the Crimean War. He wrote the original version on 2 December 1854, and it was published on 9 December 1854 in The Examiner. He was the Poet Laureate of the United Kingdom at the time. The poem was subsequently revised and expanded for inclusion in Maud and Other Poems (1855).

History

Composition

During 1854, when the United Kingdom was engaged in the  Crimean War, Tennyson wrote several patriotic poems under various pseudonyms. Scholars speculate that Tennyson created his pen names because these verses used a traditional structure Tennyson employed in his earlier career but suppressed during the 1840s, worrying that poems like "The Charge of the Light Brigade" (which he initially signed only A.T.) "might prove not to be decorous for a poet laureate".

The poem was written after the Light Cavalry Brigade suffered great casualties in the Battle of Balaclava. Tennyson wrote the poem based on two articles published in The Times: the first, published on 13 November 1854, contained the sentence "The British soldier will do his duty, even to certain death, and is not paralyzed by the feeling that he is the victim of some hideous blunder," the last three words of which provided the inspiration for his phrase "Some one had blunder'd." The poem was written in a few minutes on 2 December of the same year, based on a recollection of The Times's account; Tennyson wrote other similar poems, like "Riflemen Form!", in a very similar manner.

Later versions
Tennyson made revisions to the poem due to criticisms by the American poet Frederick Goddard Tuckerman and others; these were published in Tennyson's volume Maud and Other Poems (1855). These changes were criticized by several, including both Tennyson and Tuckerman.

At the suggestion of Jane, Lady Franklin, Tennyson sent a thousand copies of a single-sheet version of the poem to be distributed among soldiers in the Crimea. For this he rethought the revisions in Maud and Other Poems, and this rethought version was used for the second edition of Maud, in 1856.

Tennyson recited this poem onto a wax cylinder in 1890.

Kipling's postscript
Rudyard Kipling wrote "The Last of the Light Brigade" (1891) some 40 years after the appearance of "The Charge of the Light Brigade". His poem focuses on the terrible hardships faced in old age by veterans of the Crimean War, as exemplified by the cavalry men of the Light Brigade. Its purpose was to shame the British public into offering financial assistance.

First draft

Cultural references
 
 The poem is referenced in Eugene V. Debs's Canton Speech (1918).
 Lines from the poem are frequently referenced in To the Lighthouse (1927) by Virginia Woolf.
 Alfalfa recites this poem in Two Too Young (1936).
 The world wonders is a near quotation misunderstood in a communication during the Battle of Leyte Gulf in World War II.
 The poem is recited by James Stewart's character in Magic Town (1947).
 Honus recites passages from this poem in Soldier Blue (1970) in lieu of a prayer after a cavalry group is massacred by the Cheyenne.
 The poem inspired the Iron Maiden song "The Trooper" (1983).

References

Bibliography

External links

 Manuscript in Tennyson's handwriting at Archive.org
 
 The words of The Charge of the Light Brigade at Poets.org

Poetry by Alfred, Lord Tennyson
1854 poems
Narrative poems
Crimean War fiction
Poems about death
Works about the Crimean War
Poems adapted into films